Kotte Rural LLG is a local-level government (LLG) of Morobe Province, Papua New Guinea.

Wards
01. Keregia
02. Merikeo
03. Bolingboneng
04. Yunzaing
05. Wareo
06. Fior
07. Maruruo
08. Jivewaneng
09. Siki
10. Heldback

References

Local-level governments of Morobe Province